Cussonia thyrsiflora, known as the Cape coast cabbage tree, or Kaapse kuskiepersol in Afrikaans, is a small evergreen tree in the family Araliaceae.

Range
It naturally occurs in South Africa along the southern Cape coast, between Cape Town and Port Elizabeth.

Habit
It can be grown as an attractive shrub or tree for coastal gardens, as it can withstand beach soils and winds. However, it also thrives in acidic or clay soils. It is normally a thick evergreen shrub with bisexual yellow flowers and black fruits, however it can be pruned to allow it to grow as a proper tree of up to 5 meters.

References

Araliaceae
Trees of South Africa